Bishū or Bishu may refer to:

 another name for Owari Province.

 another name for Kibi Province.
 a collective name for Bizen Province, Bitchū Province, and Bingo Province.
 these are also called .

Other uses 
 Bishu, a future bass artist signed to Monstercat